Gerald Tucker (March 14, 1922 – May 29, 1979) was the head coach on the 1956 USA Men's Basketball Gold Medal Olympic Team. He was the coach of Bartlesville Phillips 66ers for four seasons from 1954 to 1958 having the most wins in the National Industrial Basketball League in each of those 4 seasons.  In 1955 Bartlesville Phillips 66ers won the AAU National Basketball Championship against the Luckett-Nix Clippers of Boulder, Colorado, winning 66-64 and in 1956 they were the runners-up to the Buchan Bakers of Seattle, losing 59–57.

Before that he was a star center at 6-foot, 6-inches for University of Oklahoma and in the AAU. In 1943 and 1947 he was named a Helms Foundation All American.  In 1947 he was the Helms Foundation Player of the Year. He went on to play for Bartlesville Phillips 66ers of the National Industrial Basketball League where he was an AAU All American and made the AAU All-Star Basketball Team, which was based on how one played in the National AAU Basketball Tournament in 1949 and 1950.

In 1989 he was named to the Final Four All 40's Team.

External links
 
 Biography of Gerald Tucker

1922 births
1979 deaths
All-American college men's basketball players
American men's basketball coaches
American men's basketball players
American Olympic coaches
Basketball coaches from Kansas
Basketball players from Kansas
Oklahoma Sooners men's basketball players
Phillips 66ers players
United States men's national basketball team coaches
Centers (basketball)